This is a list of notable independent short films. A short film refers to a film that is generally anywhere under 1 hour in length.

List of notable independent short films

2020s

2010s

2000s

1990s

Pre-1990s

References

External links
 Short Central - Collection of award-winning short films
 4Filmmaking.com - Detailed articles on producing short films.
 Shortfilmcentral.com - International database of short films, festivals and events, filmmakers and companies involved with short films.
 kondatam.com - Curated and categorized Tamil short films

Independent